Daniel Rothschild may refer to:
Daniel Rothschild (philosopher) (born 1979), American philosopher
Daniel Rothschild (general) (born 1946), Israeli major general
 Daniel Rothschild (merchant), father of Samuel Rothschild